Watch the Birdie is a 1963 British documentary directed by Ken Russell. It looks at photographer David Hurn.

External links
Watch the Birdie at Letterbox DVD
Watch the Birdie at IMDb
Watch the Birdie at BFI
Watch the Birdie at BFI Screenonline

1963 television films
British documentary films
Films directed by Ken Russell
1960s English-language films